
Gmina Smołdzino is a rural gmina (administrative district) in Słupsk County, Pomeranian Voivodeship, in northern Poland.

Villages
Gmina Smołdzino contains the villages and settlements of Boleniec, Bukowa, Człuchy, Czołpino, Czysta, Gardna Mała, Gardna Wielka, Kluki, Komnino, Łódki, Łokciowe, Przybynin, Retowo, Siecie, Siedliszcze, Smołdzino, Smołdziński Las, Stare Kluki, Stojcino, Wierzchocino, Witkowo, Wysoka and Żelazo.

Neighbouring gminas
Gmina Smołdzino is bordered by the town of Łeba and by the gminas of Główczyce, Słupsk, Ustka and Wicko.

References
Polish official population figures 2006

Smoldzino
Słupsk County